Scott Earle McLaughlin was the presiding bishop of the Orthodox Anglican Church, metropolitan archbishop of the Orthodox Anglican Communion, and chancellor of Saint Andrew's Theological College and Seminary. On 1 May 1999, McLaughlin was consecrated as a bishop by Herbert M. Groce, metropolitan archbishop of the Anglican Rite Synod in the Americas, assisted by Bishop Larry Shaver of the Anglican Rite Synod in the Americas, and Bishop Robert J. Godfrey of the Orthodox Anglican Communion. His apostolic succession is Anglican, Old Catholic, and Orthodox. McLaughlin served as suffragan bishop until 30 April 2000, when Bishop Godfrey retired. He was then elected presiding bishop of the Orthodox Anglican Church and metropolitan archbishop of the Orthodox Anglican Communion. He was the fourth archbishop to lead the Orthodox Anglican Communion and the Orthodox Anglican Church. He is married with four children; two sons and two daughters.

McLaughlin was a signatory to the Bartonville Agreement and a covenant of intercommunion with the Most Revd Augustin Bacinsky, Archbishop of the Old Catholic Church in Slovakia.

In 2012, on Ash Wednesday, McLaughlin announced his retirement effective Easter Sunday and nominated Creighton Jones of Mytle Beach, South Carolina, to be his successor. This nomination was confirmed by a vote of the general convention of the Orthodox Anglican Church on 9 June 2012.

References

External links
Orthodox Anglican Communion website
Orthodox Anglican Church website
St. Andrew's Theological College & Seminary website

Year of birth missing (living people)
21st-century Anglican archbishops
Presiding Bishops of the Anglican Orthodox Church
Former Baptists
Former Anglicans
Living people
21st-century American clergy